Crambidia pallida, the pale lichen moth, is a moth of the family Erebidae. It was described by Packard in 1864. It is found from Nova Scotia to Florida, west to Texas and north to North Dakota and Manitoba. The habitat consists of forests and woodlands.

References

Lithosiina
Moths described in 1864
Moths of North America